A Measure of the National Assembly for Wales (informally, an Assembly Measure) is primary legislation in Wales that is a category lower than an Act of Parliament. In the case of contemporary Welsh law, the difference with Acts is that the competence to pass Measures is subject to 'LCOs' or Legislative Competence Order, which transfers powers to the Assembly by amending Schedule 5 of the Government of Wales Act 2006.

It was a lower form of primary legislation as it did not contain a large bulk of powers compared to the power to make acts. In Wales each Assembly Measure had to be accompanied with a Matter which was transferred using the Legislative Competence Order (LCO) system. Each Assembly Measure, like an Act of Parliament, had to have made provision for a matter within the remit of the legislative competency of the Assembly.

Following a referendum held in 2011, the assembly gained powers to make primary legislation, then known as Acts of the Assembly. These powers came into force after the 2011 assembly elections and the assembly is no longer able to pass Measures. Existing measures will remain valid unless repealed by the assembly in the future. Following the Assembly becoming the Senedd (Welsh Parliament) in May 2020, these acts are now referred to as an Act of Senedd Cymru.

How an Assembly Measure was made

Consideration by the Assembly 
Similar to Acts, Assembly Measures face the same style and level of scrutiny. There were around four stages where the proposed legislation was scrutinised. The first stage is the agreement of the principles of the Assembly Measure, which means the first approval of the legislation for it to be scrutinised, then it will have to be scrutinized at committee level, where a committee of Assembly Members can debate and add more to the Measure which is then accompanied with debates in 'plenary', which would be required to approve the amendments.

Once everything above has been completed, the Assembly can then start the final scrutinising before the Assembly Measure gets passed and becomes law. As in other legislative systems, some laws will fail, or be withdrawn.

Royal Approval 
Assembly Measures, like all other types of legislation, will have to be approved by a head of state, that head of state being Her Majesty Queen Elizabeth II. After the Assembly Measure is passed by the National Assembly for Wales (now Senedd) the Measure will have to be taken to the Queen in Council who approves the Measure via an Order in Council. The approval would later be added to the Assembly Measure as proof of the approval. The approving order in council is not approved by both Houses of Parliament like the Orders in Council conferring power to the Assembly.

Who could propose Assembly Measures 
Like in any legislature, the National Assembly for Wales members can propose Assembly Measures. The name for an Assembly Measure proposed by a person not in the Welsh Assembly Government will be called a "Members Proposed Assembly Measure"  Meanwhile, according to the same source there will also be "Government Proposed Assembly Measures" and "Emergency Proposed Assembly Measures".  The First Welsh Legislative Counsel, a new post which commenced April 2007, working within the Office of the First Welsh Legislative Counsel, part of the Legal Services Department of the Welsh Assembly Government has responsibility for the drafting of the Welsh Assembly Government's legislative programme following the implementation of the Government of Wales Act 2006. Professor Thomas Glyn Watkin is the first person to be appointed to this post.

Enacting formula 
Assembly measures begin with the following enacting formula:

English: "This Measure, passed by the National Assembly for Wales on [Date] and approved by Her Majesty in Council on [Date], enacts the following provisions:-" 
Welsh: "Mae'r Mesur hwn, a basiwyd gan Gynulliad Cenedlaethol Cymru ar [Dyddiad] ac a gymeradwywyd gan Ei Mawrhydi yn ei Chyngor ar [Dyddiad], yn deddfu'r darpariaethau a ganlyn:-"

Subjects of Measures 
Part 4 of the Government of Wales Act 2006 gives the Senedd legislative competence in the following 20 "Subjects" outlined on schedule 7 of that act in relation to Measures. (The Senedd does not have competence with respect to all aspects of these subjects.) Since the Assembly gained the competence to pass Acts, these have not been used, but they still apply in relation to previously passed Measures.
 Agriculture, fisheries, forestry and rural development
 Ancient monuments and historic buildings
 Culture
 Economic development
 Education and training
 Environment
 Fire and rescue services and promotion of fire safety
 Food
 Health and health services
 Highways and transport
 Housing
 Local government
 Public administration
 Social welfare
 Sport and recreation
 Tourism
 Town and country planning
 Water and flood defence
 Welsh language

Confusion 

When the Government of Wales Act 2006 was passed, some people reading it became confused as to what the difference between an Assembly Measure and an Order-in-Council is. Some people thought that the Order-in-Council was just a way of conferring power to the Assembly so the Assembly could make more 'delegated legislation'. However, the Act states that the Orders in Council are used only to transfer legal power to the Assembly. In this way, the Assembly, without having to go to Parliament, could then legislate using the 'Assembly Measures' system instead of making Acts straight off. An Assembly Measure could then confer power to the Welsh ministers to make delegated legislation, or statutory instruments as guided within the Measure.

See also
NHS Redress (Wales) Measure 2008: an instance of Assembly Measures
List of Acts and Measures of the National Assembly for Wales
Act of Senedd Cymru

References

External links
Schedule 5 of the Government of Wales Act 2006, which is where each Measure receives its provisions from.

Government of Wales
Welsh laws
Statutory law